José Alberto Alfaro Gazo (born November 22, 1983), known as José Alfaro, is a Nicaraguan boxer who captured the vacant WBA lightweight title against Thai Prawet Singwancha in a split decision on December 29, 2007 in Bielefeld, Germany. He later lost that title on May 19, 2008 to Yusuke Kobori who knocked him out in only 3 rounds. His next match was against Mexican legend Erik Morales on March 27, 2010 for the vacant WBC International Welterweight. He lost via Unanimous Decision the scores were 117-111, 116-112,116-112.

External links
 

Living people
Nicaraguan male boxers
World lightweight boxing champions
1983 births